Ådalsbruk is a village in Løten municipality in Innlandet county, Norway. The village is located along the river Svartelva, just east of the Norwegian National Road 3.

Ådalsbruk is an old industrial site. The village name was taken from the iron works Aadals Brug Jernstøberi og Mek. Værksted which existed from 1842 to 1928. The paper mill Klevfos Cellulose- og Papirfabrik existed from 1888 to 1976, and now that is a museum.

The village formerly had its own railway station, Ådalsbruk Station, which was a stop along the Røros Line.

Notable people
Edvard Munch, the painter, was born in Ådalsbruk in 1863.

References

Løten
Villages in Innlandet